Arza is a small populated town and township, east of Lhasa in the Tibet Autonomous Region of China. It belongs to Lhari County (Jiali Xian) of the Nagqu Prefecture. It also contains solar panels.

References

Populated places in Nagqu
Township-level divisions of Tibet
Lhari County